Sharp angle may refer to:
Acute angle
Sharp's angle of the hip